The Roman Catholic Archdiocese of Feira de Santana is an archdiocese located in the city of Feira de Santana in Brazil.

History
 July 21, 1962: Established as Diocese of Feira de Santana from the Metropolitan Archdiocese of São Salvador da Bahia
 January 16, 2002: Promoted as Metropolitan Archdiocese of Feira de Santana

Bishops

Ordinaries, in reverse chronological order
 Archbishops of Feira de Santana (Roman rite)
 Archbishop Zanoni Demettino Castro (2015.11.18-Present)
 Archbishop Itamar Navildo Vian, O.F.M. Cap. (2002.01.16 – 2015.11.18)
 Bishops of Feira de Santana (Roman Rite) 
 Bishop Itamar Navildo Vian, O.F.M. Cap. (later Archbishop) (1995.02.22 – 2002.01.16)
 Bishop Silvério Paulo de Albuquerque, O.F.M. (1973.01.18 – 1995.02.22)
 Bishop Jackson Berenguer Prado (1962.09.24 – 1971.10.08), appointed Bishop of Feira de Santana, Bahia

Coadjutor archbishop
Zanoni Demettino Castro (2014-2015)

Suffragan dioceses
 Diocese of Barra
 Diocese of Barreiras
 Diocese of Bonfim
 Diocese of Irecê
 Diocese of Juazeiro
 Diocese of Paulo Afonso
 Diocese of Ruy Barbosa
 Diocese of Serrinha

Sources
 GCatholic.org
 Catholic Hierarchy
 Archdiocese website (Portuguese)

Roman Catholic dioceses in Brazil
Roman Catholic ecclesiastical provinces in Brazil
 
Christian organizations established in 1962
Roman Catholic dioceses and prelatures established in the 20th century
Feira de Santana